Bexlosteride is a potent and noncompetitive inhibitor of the enzyme 5α-reductase related to finasteride and dutasteride. It is selective for the type I isoform of the enzyme. It advanced to Phase III clinical trials, but development was halted at that stage, and it was never marketed.

See also 
 5α-Reductase inhibitor

References 

5α-Reductase inhibitors
Delta-lactams
Chloroarenes
Benzoquinolines
Abandoned drugs